Donald William Crisp (27 July 188225 May 1974) was an English film actor as well as an early producer, director and screenwriter. His career lasted from the early silent film era into the 1960s. He won an Academy Award for Best Supporting Actor in 1942 for his performance in How Green Was My Valley.

Early life
Donald Crisp was born George William Crisp in Bow, London, in a family home on 27 July 1882. He was the youngest of ten children (four boys and six girls) born to Elizabeth (née Christy) and James Crisp, a labourer. He was educated locally and in 1901 was living with his parents and working as a driver of a horse-drawn vehicle.

Crisp made a number of claims about his early life that were eventually proven false decades after his death. He claimed that he was born in 1880 in Aberfeldy in Perthshire, Scotland, and even went so far as to maintain a Scottish accent throughout his life in Hollywood. In fact, he had no connections to Scotland, but in 1996, a plaque commemorating him was unveiled by Scottish comedian Jimmy Logan in Crisp's supposed hometown of Aberfeldy. He claimed on alternative occasions that his father was a cattle farmer, a country doctor or a royal physician to King Edward VII. He also claimed that he was educated at Eton and Oxford, and that he served as a trooper in the 10th Hussars in the Boer War.

Early career

While travelling on the SS Carmania to the United States in July 1906, Crisp's singing talents during a ship's concert caught the attention of opera impresario John C. Fisher, who immediately offered him a job with his company. Crisp spent his first year in New York City in the Grand Opera, and the following year as a stage director. It was while touring with the company in the United States and Cuba that Crisp first became interested in the theatre. By 1910, Crisp, now using the name Donald (he retained George as a middle name), was working as a stage manager for the renowned entertainer, composer, playwright and director George M. Cohan. It was during this time he met and befriended film director D.W. Griffith. When Griffith ventured west, to seek his fortune in Hollywood in 1912, Crisp accompanied him. 

From 1908 to 1930, Crisp, in addition to directing dozens of films, also appeared in nearly 100 silent films, though many in bit or small parts. One notable exception was his casting by Griffith as General Ulysses S. Grant in Griffith's landmark film The Birth of a Nation in 1915. Another was his role in Griffith's 1919 film Broken Blossoms as "Battling Burrows", the brutal and abusive father of the film's heroine, Lucy Burrows (played by Lillian Gish; the actress was only 11 years his junior).

Director
Crisp worked as an assistant to Griffith for several years and learned much during this time from Griffith, an early master of film story telling who was influential in advancing a number of early techniques, such as cross cutting in editing his films. This experience fostered a similar passion in Crisp to become a director in his own right. His first directing credit was Little Country Mouse, made in 1914. Many directors (and actors) would find themselves turning out a dozen or more films in a single year at this time. Over the next fifteen years, Crisp directed some 70 films in all, most notably The Navigator (1924) with Buster Keaton and Don Q, Son of Zorro (1925) with Douglas Fairbanks.

When asked later by an interviewer why he eventually gave up directing and returned full-time to acting, Crisp commented that directing had become extremely wearisome because he was so often called upon, if not forced, to do favours for studio chiefs by agreeing to employ their relatives in his films. His final directorial effort was the film The Runaway Bride (1930).

Military career
Between working for Griffith and other producers, along with his many acting roles, Crisp managed to return to the U.K., serving in British army intelligence during the First World War (1914–1918). Crisp became an American citizen in 1930; during the Second World War (1939–1945), he served in the United States Army Reserve, attaining the rank of colonel.

Return to acting

With the advent of "talkies", Crisp abandoned directing and devoted himself entirely to acting after 1930. He became a much sought after character actor. Throughout the 1930s and 1940s, he appeared in a wide range of roles alongside some of the era's biggest stars, including Katharine Hepburn in The Little Minister (1934) and A Woman Rebels (1936), Charles Laughton and Clark Gable in Mutiny on the Bounty (1935), Bette Davis and Henry Fonda in That Certain Woman (1937) and Jezebel (1938), Laurence Olivier in Wuthering Heights (1939), Errol Flynn in The Private Lives of Elizabeth and Essex (1939) and The Sea Hawk (1940) and Gregory Peck in The Valley of Decision (1945).

A versatile supporting actor, Crisp could be equally good in lovable or sinister roles. During the same period he was playing loving father figures  or charming old codgers in classic films like National Velvet and Lassie Come Home, he also turned in a well-received performance as Commander Beach, the tormented presumptive grandfather in Lewis Allen's The Uninvited (1944). Undoubtedly, however, Crisp's most memorable role was as the taciturn but loving father in How Green Was My Valley (1941) directed by John Ford. The film received ten Oscar nominations, winning five, including Best Picture, with Crisp winning the Oscar for Best Supporting Actor in 1942.

Hollywood power broker
Crisp was an active and important liaison between the film industry and outside business interests. His extensive experience in business, the military and entertainment, including being a production and studio executive, lent itself well to this task. He became a highly valued adviser whose clear-headed forward thinking proved invaluable to the Bank of America, which was one of the leading sources of working capital for the film industry for many years (an industry whose life blood was loans). Crisp served on the bank's advisory board for several decades, including a stint as its chairman. In this role, he had the ear of its   board of directors, and many of the films eventually financed by the bank during the 1930s and 1940s got their most important approval from Crisp.

Later years and legacy
Crisp eventually became one of the more wealthy members of the film industry. His "banker's sobriety", extensive contacts and clarity of thought allowed him to make good investments, particularly in the real estate market. He continued to appear in films throughout the 1950s and into the early 1960s. During more than half a century as an actor, he appeared in as many as 400 two-reel and feature-length productions, perhaps a great deal more. John Carradine, who counted over 500 films to his own credit (the Internet Movie Database records over 300), told his son Keith, who repeated the story during a 2018 Gilbert Gottfried podcast, that only Donald Crisp had appeared in more movies. Crisp's final screen role was as Grandpa Spencer alongside former film co-stars Henry Fonda and Maureen O'Hara in the 1963 film Spencer's Mountain. This film, adapted from the novel by Earl Hamner, Jr., was the basis for the 1970s television series The Waltons.

Crisp was in his eighties by the time he quit acting entirely, continuing to work long after it was financially necessary simply because he enjoyed it. He was married three times. In 1912, he married actress Helen Pease, and they remained together until her death the following year. In 1917, he married Marie Stark, whom he divorced in 1920; she went on to act in silent films as Marie Crisp. In 1932, he married film screenwriter Jane Murfin, whom he divorced in 1944. He died in 1974, a few months short of his 92nd birthday, due to complications from a series of strokes. In addition to being one of the premier character actors of his era, he left behind an extensive list of contributions to the film industry he worked to promote for more than fifty years. He is buried at Forest Lawn Memorial Park Cemetery in Glendale, California.

He was a staunch Republican who campaigned for Thomas Dewey in 1944.

On February 8, 1960, Crisp received a star on the Hollywood Walk of Fame for his contributions to the motion pictures industry at 1628 Vine Street.

Partial filmography

As actor

The French Maid (1908, Short)
Through the Breakers (1909, Short) as At the Club
Sunshine Sue (1910, Short) as Head of Sweatshop
A Plain Song (1910, Short) as at station
A Child's Stratagem (1910, Short) as policeman
The Golden Supper (1910, Short) as courtier (uncredited)
Winning Back His Love (1910, Short) as at stage door
The Two Paths (1911, Short) as footman
Heart Beats of Long Ago (1911, Short) as courtier
What Shall We Do with Our Old? (1911, Short) as bailiff 
The Lily of the Tenements (1911, Short)
A Decree of Destiny (1911, Short) as at the club / at the wedding
The White Rose of the Wilds (1911, Short)
Her Awakening (1911, Short) as accident witness
The Primal Call (1911, Short)
Out from the Shadow (1911, Short) at a dance
The Making of a Man (1911, Short) as actor / backstage
The Long Road (1911, Short) as a servant / the landlord
The Battle (1911, Short) as a Union soldier
The Miser's Heart (1911, Short) as a policeman
The Italian Barber (1911, Short) as at ball
Help Wanted (1911, Short) as in corridor
Fate's Turning (1911, Short) as a valet
The Poor Sick Men (1911, Short) as policeman
A Wreath of Orange Blossoms (1911, Short) as servant
Conscience (1911, Short) as policeman
In the Days of '49 (1911, Short) 
The Diving Girl (1911, Short) as a bather
Swords and Hearts (1911, Short) as bushwacker
The Squaw's Love (1911, Short) as Indian
The Adventures of Billy (1911, Short) as first tramp
The Failure (1911, Short) as employer
The Eternal Mother (1912, Short) as in-field
The Musketeers of Pig Alley (1912, Short) as rival gang member
The Inner Circle (1912, Short)
Pirate Gold (1913, Short)
Near to Earth (1913, Short)
The Sheriff's Baby (1913, Short)
Olaf—An Atom (1913, Short) as the beggar
The Mothering Heart (1913, Short) (unconfirmed)
Two Men of the Desert (1913, Short)
Black and White (1913, Short)
The Battle of the Sexes (1914) as Frank Andrews
 The Great Leap; Until Death Do Us Part (1914)
Home, Sweet Home (1914) as the mother's son
The Escape (1914) as "Bull" McGee
The Folly of Anne (1914, Short)
The Sisters (1914, Short)
The Mysterious Shot (1914, Short) as Buck
The Stiletto (1914, Short) as Angelino
The Mountain Rat (1914, Short) as Steve
Ashes of the Past (1914, Short)
The Different Man (1914, Short) as ranch farmer
The Miniature Portrait (1914, Short)
The Soul of Honor (1914, Short)
The Newer Woman (1914, Short)
Their First Acquaintance (1914, Short)
The Birthday Present (1914, Short) as the burglar
The Weaker Strain (1914, Short)
The Avenging Conscience (1914) as Minor Role (uncredited)
The Idiot (1914, Short)
The Tavern of Tragedy (1914, Short) as spy, Bob Jameson
Her Mother's Necklace (1914, Short) as the burglar
A Lesson in Mechanics (1914, Short)
Down the Hill to Creditville (1914, Short)
The Great God Fear (1914, Short) as Dick Stull
His Mother's Trust (1914, Short) as Dr. Keene
The Warning (1914, Short) as Mr. Edwards
Another Chance (1914, Short) as The Tramp
A Question of Courage (1914, Short)
Over the Ledge (1914, Short)
An Old Fashioned Girl (1915, Short) 
The Birth of a Nation (1915) as Gen. U.S. Grant
The Love Route (1915) as Harry Marshall
The Commanding Officer (1915) as Col. Archer
May Blossom (1915) as Steve Harland
The Foundling (1915) (scenes cut)
A Girl of Yesterday (1915) as A. H. Monroe
Ramona (1916) as Jim Farrar
Intolerance (1916) as Extra (uncredited)
Joan the Woman (1916)
Broken Blossoms (1919) as Battling Burrows
The Bonnie Brier Bush (1921; also directed) as Lachlan Campbell
Don Q, Son of Zorro (1925) as Don Sebastian
The Black Pirate (1926) as MacTavish
Stand and Deliver (1928) as London Club Member (uncredited)
The River Pirate (1928) as Caxton
The Viking (1928) as Leif Ericsson
Trent's Last Case (1929) as Sigsbee Manderson
The Pagan (1929) as Mr. Roger Slater
The Return of Sherlock Holmes (1929) as Colonel Moran
Scotland Yard (1930) as Charles Fox
Svengali (1931) as The Laird
Kick In (1931) as Police Commissioner Harvey
A Passport to Hell (1932) as Sgt. Snyder
Red Dust (1932) as Guidon, overseer
Broadway Bad (1933) as Darrall
The Crime Doctor (1934) as D.A. Mr. Anthony
The Key (1934) as Peadar Conlan
The Life of Vergie Winters (1934) as Mike Davey
British Agent (1934) as Marshall O'Reilly (scenes cut)
What Every Woman Knows (1934) as David Wylie
The Little Minister (1934) as Doctor McQueen
Vanessa: Her Love Story (1935) as George, the Inn Keeper
Laddie (1935) as Mr. Pryor
Oil for the Lamps of China (1935) as J.T. McCarter
Mutiny on the Bounty (1935) as Burkitt
 The White Angel (1936) as Doctor Hunt
Mary of Scotland (1936) as Huntly
The Charge of the Light Brigade (1936) as Col. Campbell
A Woman Rebels (1936) as Judge Byron Thisthlewaite
Beloved Enemy (1936) as Liam Burke
The Great O'Malley (1937) as Captain Cromwell
Parnell (1937) as Davitt
The Life of Emile Zola (1937) as Maitre Labori
Confession (1937) as Presiding Judge
That Certain Woman (1937) as Jack Merrick, Sr.
Sergeant Murphy (1938) as Col. Todd Carruthers
Jezebel (1938) as Dr. Livingstone
The Beloved Brat (1938) as John Morgan
The Amazing Dr. Clitterhouse (1938) as Police Inspector Lewis Lane
Valley of the Giants (1938) as Andy Stone
The Sisters (1938) as Tim Hazelton
Comet Over Broadway (1938) as Joe Grant
The Dawn Patrol (1938) as Phipps
The Oklahoma Kid (1939) as Judge Hardwick
Wuthering Heights (1939) as Dr. Kenneth
Juarez (1939) as General Marechal Achille Bazaine
Sons of Liberty (1939, Short) as Alexander MacDongall
Daughters Courageous (1939) as Samuel 'Sam' Sloane
The Old Maid (1939) as Dr. Lanshell
The Private Lives of Elizabeth and Essex (1939) as Francis Bacon
Dr. Ehrlich's Magic Bullet (1940) as Minister Althoff
Brother Orchid (1940) as Brother Superior
The Sea Hawk (1940) as Sir John Burleson
City for Conquest (1940) as Scotty MacPherson
Knute Rockne, All American (1940) as Father John Callahan
Shining Victory (1941) as Dr. Drewitt
Dr. Jekyll and Mr. Hyde (1941) as Sir Charles Emery
How Green Was My Valley (1941) as Gwilym Morgan
The Gay Sisters (1942) as Ralph Pedloch
Forever and a Day (1943) as Capt. Martin
Lassie Come Home (1943) as Sam Carraclouch
The Uninvited (1944) as Commander Beech
The Adventures of Mark Twain (1944) as J.B. Pond
National Velvet (1944) as Mr. Herbert Brown
Son of Lassie (1945) as Sam Carraclouch
The Valley of Decision (1945) as William Scott
Ramrod (1947) as Jim Crew
Hills of Home (1948) as Drumsheugh
Whispering Smith (1948) as Barney Rebstock
Challenge to Lassie (1949) as John "Jock" Gray
Bright Leaf (1950) as Mayor James Singleton
Home Town Story (1951) as John MacFarland
Prince Valiant (1954) as King Aguar
The Long Gray Line (1955) as Old Martin
The Man from Laramie (1955) as Alec Waggoman
Drango (1957) as Judge Allen
Saddle the Wind (1958) as Dennis Deneen
The Last Hurrah (1958) as Cardinal Martin Burke
A Dog of Flanders (1959) as Jehan Daas
Pollyanna (1960) as Mayor Karl Warren
Greyfriars Bobby: The True Story of a Dog (1961) as James Brown
Spencer's Mountain (1963) as Grandpa Zubulon Spencer (final film role)

As a director

Her Father's Silent Partner (1914, Short)
Ramona (1916)
Rimrock Jones (1918)
Believe Me, Xantippe (1918)
The Goat (1918)
Johnny Get Your Gun (1919)
Love Insurance (1919)
Why Smith Left Home (1919)
It Pays to Advertise (1919)
Too Much Johnson (1919)
The Six Best Cellars (1920)
Miss Hobbs (1920)
Held by the Enemy (1920) 
Appearances (1921) 
The Princess of New York (1921)
The Bonnie Brier Bush (1921; also acted)
Tell Your Children (1922)
The Navigator (1924) (co-directed with Buster Keaton)
Ponjola (1924) (co-directed with James Young)
Don Q, Son of Zorro (1925; also acted)
Young April (1926)
Dress Parade (1927)
Nobody's Widow (1927)
The Cop (1928)
The Runaway Bride (1930)

See also 

List of actors with Academy Award nominations

References

External links

20th-century American male actors
20th-century English male actors
American male film actors
English male film actors
American male silent film actors
English male silent film actors
Best Supporting Actor Academy Award winners
Silent film directors
Film directors from Los Angeles
Film directors from London
Male actors from London
Writers from London
United States Army colonels
United States Army personnel of World War II
United States Army reservists
British Army personnel of World War I
Naturalized citizens of the United States
British emigrants to the United States
People from Bow, London
Burials at Forest Lawn Memorial Park (Glendale)
1882 births
1974 deaths